Andrew John Gode (born 5 April 1990) is an Australian cricketer. He made his List A debut for Queensland in the 2018–19 JLT One-Day Cup on 1 October 2018.

References

External links
 

1990 births
Living people
Australian cricketers
Queensland cricketers